Fellows of the Royal Society elected in 1784.

Fellows

 Gilbert Blane (1749–1834), Royal physician 
 John Campbell, 4th Earl of Breadalbane (1762–1834) 
 James Cecil, 1st Marquess of Salisbury (1748–1823) 
 Charles Theodore, Elector Palatine of Bavaria (1724–1799) 
 George Edgcumbe, 1st Earl of Mount Edgcumbe (1721–1795)
 Alexander Gordon, 4th Duke of Gordon (1743–1827)
 Thomas Gresley (d. 1785), of Four Oaks, Warwickshire 
 Busick Harwood (c.1745–1814), Professor of Medicine 
 Henry Hugh Hoare (1762–1841) 
 George Kinnaird, 7th Lord Kinnaird (1745–1805) 
 Thomas Potter (1740–1801), Welsh judge 
 Luigi Malaspina di Sannazzaro, Marquis Sannazzaro (1754–1835) 
 John Sheldon (1752–1808), anatomist and surgeon 
 John Sinclair (1754–1835), barrister 
 Caleb Whitefoord (1734–1810), wine merchant, friend of Benjamin Franklin 
 Sir George Yonge (1731–1812), Secretary at War

References

1784 in science
1784
1784 in Great Britain